The Godfather is the soundtrack from the film of the same name, released in 1972 by Paramount Records, and in 1991 on compact disc by MCA. Unless noted, the cues were composed by Nino Rota and conducted by Carlo Savina (who was credited on the LP, but not the CD). The song "I Have but One Heart" is sung by Al Martino, who performed it in the film as character Johnny Fontane.

The score was nominated for an Academy Award; however, the Academy withdrew the nomination after determining that the "Love Theme" was a rewritten version of Nino Rota's music from the 1958 film Fortunella.

Background and recording

Coppola hired Italian composer Nino Rota to create the underscore for the film, including the main theme, "Speak Softly, Love". In October 1971, Coppola flew to Rome with a copy of the film to give Rota to view and create the score accordingly.  For the score, Rota was to relate to the situations and characters in the film. Scott Cain of The Atlanta Journal and Constitution reacted to Rota's work with the movie's score by saying that regardless of how the movie turned out, "it will be worthwhile just for Rota's contributions." Rota synthesized new music for the film and took some parts from his 1958 Fortunella film score, in order to create an Italian feel and evoke the tragic film's themes. Rota also based the piece Main Theme (The Godfather Waltz) off the opening melody of Jean Sibelius' Symphony No. 1. Paramount executive Evans found the score to be too "highbrow" and did not want to use it; however, it was used after Coppola managed to get Evans to agree. Coppola believed that Rota's musical piece gave the film even more of an Italian feel. Coppola's father, Carmine, created some additional music for the film, particularly the music played by the band during the opening wedding scene.

There are nine instances within the film where incidental music can be heard, including C'è la luna mezzo mare and Cherubino's aria, Non so più cosa son from Le Nozze di Figaro. There was a soundtrack released for the film in 1972 in vinyl form by Paramount Records, on CD in 1991 by Geffen Records, and digitally by Geffen on August 18, 2005. The album contains over 31 minutes of music coming from the film, with most being composed by Rota, along with a song from Coppola and one by Johnny Farrow and Marty Symes. There were 29 recordings of Nino Rota's music on the market by April 1972, specifically the songs recorded were "The Godfather Waltz", "Speak Softly Love," and "Love Theme from The Godfather." It was expected more recordings would be hitting the market as the year went on.

Track listing

Reception

The soundtrack was well received by music critics. The United Press International's William D. Laffler wrote that the "Main Title" was a "haunting piece of music which generates nostalgic longing for things past and a foreboding underlying theme." He felt that the soundtrack grows on the listener with each play and predicted it would become one of the biggest sellers in the calendar year. William J. Knittle Jr. of the Daily News–Post felt Rota's titular theme was why The Godfather was "close to being the perfect American film." He continued by stating Rota broke from his "usual lush string tour de force." He felt the music was "meaningful and involving," while the use of cello and cornet solos demonstrated the isolation and insulation of the Corleone family. He closed by saying the music showed Italian influence and had a natural progression. The Journal and Courier'''s Bernard Drew felt Rota's musical pieces were haunting and "bridged gaps and served as a reminder of how things were."
Harry Haun of The Tennessean described Rota's score as "baleful," but felt it kept with the pace of the movie well.
Peter Barsocchini who wrote for The Times wrote that The Godfather soundtrack was able to stand on its own. He elaborated on the soundtrack stating it was "extremely evocative" and that it kept with the time period the movie was set. He did state that the soundtrack was "rich and interesting, without, except for one cut (the vocal by Al Martino), being at all typed." He felt the "Main Title" was the best track on the album because: "It is at once chilling and plaintive and nostalgic, but it also evokes the humanity of The Godfather, gives the image of a man instead of a ruthless monster, which is a brilliant composition." Barsocchini wrote that "The Halls of Fear" explored the concept of fear well in an a-melodramatic way. He summed up the album by stating it was worthy of one's attention even if not interested in the film. Detroit Free Press's Bob Talbert described Rota's score as "right on the money" and "[captured] the feel of the '40s and the power of Marlon Brando." He generally commented that the instruments used in the movie matched the intensity of Brando and Al Pacino. He also described Martino as "a thinly disguised Frank Sinatra." Allmusic gave the album five out of five stars, with editor Zach Curd saying it is a "dark, looming, and elegant soundtrack." An editor for Filmtracks believed that Rota was successful in relating the music to the film's core aspects.

Rota's score was also nominated for Grammy Award for Best Original Score for a Motion Picture or TV Special at the 15th Grammy Awards. Rota was announced the winner of the category on March 3 at the Grammys' ceremony in Nashville, Tennessee. Rota had received a nomination for the Best Original Score at the 45th Academy Awards. Upon further review of Rota's love theme from The Godfather, the Academy found that Rota had used a similar score in Eduardo De Filippo's 1958 comedy Fortunella. This led to re-balloting, where members of the music branch chose from six films: The Godfather and the five films that had been on the shortlist for best original dramatic score but did not get nominated. John Addison's score for Sleuth'' won this new vote, and thus replaced Rota's score on the official list of nominees.

Credits

Composer: Carmine Coppola
Composer: Johnny Farrow
Featured artist: Al Martino
Composer: Giovanni Rota
Composer and primary artist: Nino Rota
Composer and primary artist: Carlo Savina
Composer: Marty Symes
Source:

Release history

References

Footnotes

Citations

Bibliography

External links
Track List at discogs.com

Soundtrack 1
Godfather (soundtrack)
MCA Records soundtracks
Paramount Records (1969) soundtracks
Album covers by S. Neil Fujita
Crime film soundtracks

he:הסנדק (סרט)#פסקול